The first Rockingham ministry was a British ministry headed by the Marquess of Rockingham from 1765 to 1766 during the reign of King George III. The government was made up mainly of his followers known as the Rockingham Whigs. The most influential member of the government was the Duke of Newcastle, a former Prime Minister, who served as Lord Privy Seal. It is often referred to as the only government ever to have been made up almost entirely of members of the Jockey Club, with Rockingham himself being a prominent patron and follower of the turf. Rockingham was noted for his ignorance of foreign affairs, and his ministry failed to reverse the growing isolation of Britain within Europe .

The Rockingham ministry fell in 1766 and was replaced by one headed by William Pitt, later the Earl of Chatham.

Cabinet
:

Changes
October 1765 – The Duke of Cumberland (also the uncle of King George III) dies.
May 1766 – The Duke of Grafton resigns from the cabinet. Henry Seymour Conway succeeds him as Northern Secretary, and the Duke of Richmond succeeds Conway as Southern Secretary.

Ministers not in Cabinet
 Lord Chamberlain – The Duke of Portland

References

 
 
 
 

British ministries
Government
1765 establishments in Great Britain
1766 disestablishments in Great Britain
1760s in Great Britain
Ministries of George III of the United Kingdom